Ipe or IPE can refer to:

 Isopropyl ether, a chemical solvent, usually in the form of DIPE (diisopropyl ether)
 Icosapent ethyl, that is, ethyl eicosapentaenoic acid, an omega-3 lipid formulation
 L’Institut pour I’Expertise (IPE), that is, IPE Management School Paris, a private higher education institution in Paris, France
 International political economy, an academic discipline
 Ipê, trees in the genus Handroanthus and their wood 
 Ipe (software), an extensible drawing editor
 Innotech Performance Exhaust (iPE), a manufacturer of exhaust system and wheels in Taiwan.
 Institute of Public Enterprise in India
 Integrity Policy Enforcement, a Linux Security Module (LSM) that enables additional security features
 International Petroleum Exchange (old name), that is, Intercontinental Exchange Futures (ICE Futures), a futures and options exchange
 International Petroleum Exposition, a former trade fair held periodically in Oklahoma from 1923 to 1979
 Interprofessional education, integration of specialties in professional education
 Immersion pulmonary edema, that is, swimming-induced pulmonary edema
 Interstitial pulmonary emphysema, that is, pulmonary interstitial emphysema, a rare lung condition in newborns
 Individual protective equipment, as personal protective equipment is sometimes called (especially in military NBC/ABC/WMD contexts)
 IPE, a European type of I-beam
 Île-du-Prince-Édouard, that is, Prince Edward Island, a province of Canada
 Ideal polarized electrode, a type of ideal electrode
 Icosahedral prism, a type of polytope in geometry
 iris pigment epithelium, a one-cell-thick layer of cuboidal cells lying behind the iris of the eye
 Pyrenean Ecology Institute, a research center from Spain